You Baby may refer to:

 You Baby, a 1966 album by The Turtles
 "You Baby" (song), a 1966 song by The Turtles
 You, Baby, a 1968 album by Nat Adderley.  The first composition by the same title on the album is an instrumental cover of You (Marvin Gaye song).
 You Babe, a 1988 song by R&B group DeBarge.